Catocala amabilis is a moth of the family Erebidae. It is found in Transcaspia.

References

Moths described in 1907
amabilis
Moths of Asia